Maibritt is a given name. Notable people with the name include:

Maibritt Kviesgaard (born 1986), Danish handball player
Maibritt Saerens (born 1970), Danish actress

See also
Maibritt, das Mädchen von den Inseln

Danish feminine given names